Cameron Balloons is a company established in 1971 in Bristol, England, by Don Cameron to manufacture hot air balloons. Cameron had previously, with others, constructed ten hot air balloons under the name Omega. Production was in the basement of his house, moving in 1972 to an old church in the city. In 1983 Cameron Balloons moved into its current premises in the former Robinsons paper bag/printing factory (built in 1887 in the Bedminster area of the city). In 1989 the company received the Queen's Award for Export.

Output has grown to around 110 balloons per year.  , Cameron Balloons accounted for 1,073 of the 1,553 hot air balloons registered with the United Kingdom Civil Aviation Authority.
Cameron Balloons is also famous for its special shapes, the first being Robertson's Golly, constructed in 1975. Most special shapes are made for commercial advertising, but some have been bought privately. Notable amongst these private buyers is the late Malcolm Forbes of Forbes magazine, who commissioned a number of special shapes, including Harley-Davidson motorbike, Sphinx, bust of Beethoven, French Chateau, Pagoda and Minaret. The company also produced the BBC Globe balloon, made popular by the BBC One 'Balloon' idents. More recently the company has manufactured special shapes for KAWS., Patricia Piccinini., and Bart Van Peel.

The Bedminster factory occupies three floors. Most factory space (first and second floors) is devoted to laying out the hundreds of meters of fabric which is cut into panels, then sewn together by machinists. When the artwork on the balloon is intricate, the designs are printed on to the fabric which is then sewn into the envelope.

The factory also contains an engineering department for bending, cutting and welding the metal frames used for the baskets and burners. In the basket department, the woven baskets are upholstered in bespoke colours of leather, suede and cordura. The rigging department ensures each aircraft has the correct control lines to operate the turning and deflation systems.

The company also makes airships, helium balloons and static inflatables. It has been involved in record-breaking balloon flight attempts including trans-Atlantic, altitude and distance records.

Expansion via acquisitions

During the 1990s, the company strengthened its position, via a string of acquisitions. First, Cameron acquired its main British competitor Thunder & Colt Balloons. Then, it bought the smaller Sky Balloons, which had been formed by former Thunder & Colt employees after the company's sale. Finally, Cameron acquired two-thirds ownership of Lindstrand Balloons, which had been formed by Per Lindstrand after he left Thunder & Colt in the early 1990s. Cameron bought the majority stake in Lindstrand Balloons from Rory McCarthy, a British industrialist associated with Richard Branson, who had invested in the company to support Branson's series of record-setting balloon flights.

Cameron has integrated the Thunder & Colt product range, notably the AS-series hot air airships, into its own catalogue, while Sky's products have been discontinued. On 15 April 2015 it was reported that Lindstrand Balloons had closed, with 19 workers losing their jobs, citing the strength of the pound and terrorism threats in the Middle East as factors in the slow sales of balloons. Cameron Balloons continue to support the Lindstrand Balloons aircraft.

See also
 Cameron Skystar
 Rozière balloon

References

External links
 Cameron Balloons Ltd. (UK company)
 Cameron Balloons US (independently owned US affiliate/licensee)

Balloon manufacturers
Ballooning
Aircraft manufacturers of England
Manufacturing companies based in Bristol
1971 establishments in England
Manufacturing companies established in 1971